Mohamed Ali Al-Malky (born 4 April 1959) is a Saudi Arabian sprinter. He competed in the men's 4 × 100 metres relay at the 1976 Summer Olympics.

References

1959 births
Living people
Athletes (track and field) at the 1976 Summer Olympics
Saudi Arabian male sprinters
Olympic athletes of Saudi Arabia
Place of birth missing (living people)